Mercedes Godoy (March 16, 1890 – after 1932) was a Mexican socialite in the United States, and author of When I Was a Girl in Mexico (1919).

Early life 

Her father was a Mexican-born United States citizen, a writer, translator, and diplomat who served in Cuba, Guatemala, and the United States. Her grandfather, José Antonio Godoy, was Mexican consul in San Francisco.

Career 
Godoy was a debutante in the 1905–1906 social season in Washington, D.C., while her father was the Mexican consul in that city. She was described as resembling Alice Roosevelt Longworth. She was a delegation aide to the Women's Auxiliary Committee, at the Second Pan-American Scientific Conference in 1915. 

Godoy was a trained singer. In 1915, she sang at a musical evening given by the Musical Harmony Club at the Colonial School for Girls. In 1916, she became vice-president of the Harmony Improvement Society. In 1917, she was on the committee for a Red Cross benefit dance at the Cairo hotel. In 1918, she appeared in a one-act play in Spanish, at a benefit for earthquake relief in Guatemala.

In 1919 Godoy published a memoir of her childhood games, holidays, foods, and other details, When I Was a Girl in Mexico. "This book will be a revelation to those American children who imagine that Mexican is a synonym for bandits," predicted one reviewer. It was part of the "Children of Other Lands" series about childhoods in different cultures, including Hólmfríður Árnadóttir's When I Was a Girl in Iceland, Cornelia De Groot's When I Was a Girl in Holland, Mousa J. Kaleel's When I Was a Boy in Palestine, and Yan Phou Lee's When I Was a Boy in China.

Personal life 
Godoy lived in Washington, Havana, and New York as a young woman, with her parents and her siblings. She was living in Mexico City when her mother died in 1923.

References 

Mexican women writers
1890 births
Mexican socialites
Year of death missing
Mexican emigrants to the United States